The River Leam, anciently Leame, etc, is a river in England which rises at Hellidon Hill in Northamptonshire then flows through Warwickshire, including the town of Leamington Spa, named after it. It then flows into the River Avon near Warwick, and thence into the River Severn.   The name is first recorded in 956 as Limenan, and derives from British Lemanā, meaning "elm-tree river".

Tributaries 
Its major tributaries are  Rains Brook, River Itchen, River Stowe and Radford Brook.

Water quality
The Environment Agency measure water quality of the river systems in England. Each is given an overall ecological status, which may be one of five levels: high, good, moderate, poor and bad. There are several components that are used to determine this, including biological status, which looks at the quantity and varieties of invertebrates, angiosperms and fish. Chemical status, which compares the concentrations of various chemicals against known safe concentrations, is rated good or fail.

Water quality of the River Leam in 2019:

See also
Rivers of the United Kingdom

References

External links
 The Manor of Hunningham

Leam
Leamington Spa
1Leam